Shuja-ul-Mulk is a Pakistani politician who served as a member of Senate of Pakistan between 2003 and 2009.

He is the brother of former Chief Justice of Pakistan Nasir-ul-Mulk.

References

Members of the Senate of Pakistan
Living people
Year of birth missing (living people)